National Highway 753H, commonly referred to as NH 753H is a national highway in India. It is a secondary route of National Highway 53.  NH-753H runs in the state of Maharashtra in India.

Route 
NH753H connects Sillod,Bhokardan, Rajur,Jalna, Ambad and Wadigodri in the state of Maharashtra.

Junctions  
 
  Terminal near Sillod.
  Terminal near Wadigodri.

See also 
 List of National Highways in India
 List of National Highways in India by state

References

External links 

 NH 753H on OpenStreetMap

National highways in India
National Highways in Maharashtra